Jensen's skate (Amblyraja jenseni), also known as the shortail skate, is a poorly known species of fish discovered in 2004 during a study of bottom ichthyofauna aboard the Norwegian RV G.O. Sars, where four species were identified, including A. jensieni.

Etymology
The skate is named in honor of Danish zoologist Adolf Severin Jensen (1866–1953), of Lund University, for his contributions to the ichthyology of the North Atlantic Ocean.

Taxonomy
The shortail skate is a member of the family Rajidae, of which 30 genera and over 180 species are recognized. Amblyrija is the genus name of which 10 species are recognized, including A. doellojuradoi (southern thorny skate), A. frerichsi (thickbody skate), A. robertsi (bigmouth skate), etc.

Description
Members of the family Rajidae carry uncharacteristically similar body plans. This makes visual identification of these individuals extremely difficult. Detailed visual descriptions of A. jenseni are hard to attain, so the description below may represent several of the family Rajidae and should not necessarily be used to differentiate them. 
A. jenseni is a medium-sized skate. Its maximum known length is 74.3 cm (29.3 in) for males and 85 cm (33 in) for females. Its coloration is chocolate-brown to gray-brown above with scattered darker spots. Ventral on the body appears a patchy white and brown mixture, except for the pelvic fin lobes and tail, which are darker. These white patches are on the snout, upper abdomen, nostrils, mouth gill slits, and anal opening. Its underside is smooth and its dorsal surface is densely covered with prickly scales. Two or three pairs of distinctive scapular thorns are on each shoulder, usually arranged in a triangle, and a row of 24-29 median thorns occur along the back, flanked by a row of smaller lateral thorns on the tail. The tail of the shorttail skate is relatively short. 
Sexual dimorphism in shorttail skates is present in pelvic fin structure that the males modify to act as copulatory claspers, as well as alternate disc lengths, horizontal diameter of the orbit, height of the tail at the pelvic fin tips, length of the third gill slit, and distances from the center of the anus to the first and second dorsal fins.

Distribution and habitat
This species of skate is believed to only be found in the North Atlantic, off the coasts of New England, Nova Scotia, Grand Banks of Newfoundland, Iceland, Ireland, Canada, and along the Mid-Atlantic Ridge at depths of 167 to 2,548 m (548 to 8,360 ft), making it one of the deepest-occurring skates known.

Biology and ecology
Skates represent a critical consumer of invertebrates and small fish, representing a similar role as apex predators of the ecosystem. Little is documented about their feeding behavior, but like other of its family, it presumably would eat various cephalopods, crustaceans, and small bony fish such as rattails and teleost fishers.
A. jenseni is presumed to be oviparous like other skates. but no observed reproduction cycles have been reported.

References

Further reading
 
 Amblyraja jenseni IUCN Red List of Threatened Species 2020

External links
 Species Description of Amblyraja jenseni at www.shark-references.com

Taxa named by Henry Bryant Bigelow
Taxa named by William Charles Schroeder
Fish described in 1950
Amblyraja